Massimiliano Maisto (born 27 August 1980 in Milan) is an Italian former professional road cyclist.

Major results
2003
 1st Stage 9 Giro Ciclistico d'Italia
 1st Stage 2 Giro del Friuli Venezia Giulia
2005
 3rd Giro della Valsesia 1
 5th Coppa della Pace
 7th Giro delle Valli Aretine
2006
 6th Trofeo Melinda
 8th Coppa Ugo Agostoni
2007
 7th Coppa Ugo Agostoni
 10th Memorial Marco Pantani
 10th Giro d'Oro
2008
 1st Tour du Jura
 8th Coppa Ugo Agostoni
 9th Giro del Mendrisiotto
 10th Tour du Doubs

References

External links

1980 births
Living people
Italian male cyclists
Cyclists from Milan